Luzzani is an Italian surname. Notable people with the surname include:

Angelo Luzzani (1896–1960), Italian lawyer and footballer
Giancarlo Luzzani (1912–?), Swiss field hockey player

Italian-language surnames